The 1952 Illinois Fighting Illini football team was an American football team that represented the University of Illinois during the 1952 Big Ten Conference football season.  In their 11th year under head coach Ray Eliot, the Illini compiled a 4–5 record and finished in a three-way tie for sixth place in the Big Ten Conference. Halfback Al Brosky was selected as the team's most valuable player.

Schedule

Games summaries

Iowa
Following the win at Iowa, which was full of penalties and a couple of ejections for fighting, Iowa students began to throw fruit, cans, and bottles at the officials and Illinois' team as they left the field.  One Iowa student was also punched by an Illinois player in the melee.  Illinois and Iowa were not scheduled to play in 1953 and 1954, but their athletic directors decided to expand that timeline to 1958 in order to allow for a "cooling-off" period.  That time frame was eventually extended until 1967, which created a 14-season gap in the series between the conference schools.

References

Illinois
Illinois Fighting Illini football seasons
Illinois Fighting Illini football